The Central Academy (also known as the Old Central Academy High School) is a historic site in Palatka, Florida. Established in 1892, Central Academy became the first accredited African-American high school in Florida in 1924. It was added to the U.S. National Register of Historic Places November 12, 1998 and is located at 127 Washington Street. 

The first Central Academy building was destroyed by fire in 1936. The present building replaced it in 1937. For a time it served as the school district's transportation office. The building, which the district turned over to the Palatka Housing Authority, fell into disrepair. A committee is working to raise money for its restoration.

References

External links
 Putnam County listings at National Register of Historic Places
 Palatka Historical Trail at Historic Hiking Trails
 Palatka's Bethel African Methodist Episcopal Church at Visit Florida
 Historic Central Academy

National Register of Historic Places in Putnam County, Florida
Palatka, Florida
Buildings and structures in Putnam County, Florida
1892 establishments in Florida